Post-amendment to the Tamil Nadu Entertainments Tax Act 1939 on 1 April 1958, Gross jumped to 140 per cent of Nett Commercial Taxes Department disclosed 5.12 crore in entertainment tax revenue for the year.

The following is a list of films produced in the Tamil film industry in India in 1965, in alphabetical order.

1965

References 

Films, Tamil
Lists of 1965 films by country or language
1965
1960s Tamil-language films